Phil Jackson Ibargüen Sanchez (born February 2, 1985) is a Colombian football striker.

Club career
He began his career at Cortuluá in 2004 and Independiente Santa Fe in 2005 before moving to Ecuador to play with Delfín Sporting Club in 2006. Portuguese SuperLiga club F.C. Paços de Ferreira brought him in for the 2006-07 season, and in between he spent some time on loan to other Portuguese clubs. In summer 2008 he moved to Bosnia where he signed with FK Laktaši playing in the Premier League of Bosnia and Herzegovina. He will move to another Bosnian top league club NK Čelik Zenica in January 2009. In January 2011 he moved to a lower league Bosnian club HNK Sloga Uskoplje but in the following summer he will sign with Bosnian top league club HŠK Zrinjski Mostar. He then played with Al-Ittihad SCC Ibb in Yemeni League.

International career
Phil Jackson was part of the Colombia national under-20 football team.

Unfortunately Phil Jackson Ibargüen was a victim of human trafficking.

References

1985 births
Living people
Association football forwards
Colombian footballers
Colombia under-20 international footballers
Categoría Primera A players
Primeira Liga players
Premier League of Bosnia and Herzegovina players
Cortuluá footballers
Independiente Santa Fe footballers
Delfín S.C. footballers
F.C. Paços de Ferreira players
C.D. Tondela players
FK Laktaši players
NK Čelik Zenica players
HŠK Zrinjski Mostar players
FK Sloboda Tuzla players
Colombian expatriate footballers
Expatriate footballers in Ecuador
Colombian expatriate sportspeople in Portugal
Expatriate footballers in Bosnia and Herzegovina
Expatriate footballers in Portugal
Expatriate footballers in Yemen
Sportspeople from Chocó Department